"Dance" is a song recorded by Romanian recording artist Alexandra Stan for her sophomore studio album, Unlocked (2014). The track was made available for digital download on 16 July 2014, as the album's third single. "Dance" was written by Stan, Cosmin Basasteanu, Alexandru Cotoi, Lee Anna McCollum, Mika Moupondo and Erik Lidbom, while production was handled by both Cazan and Lidbom. A music video for the song was directed by Khaled Mokhtar and debuted on Stan's YouTube channel on 18 July 2014, where it has since amassed over ten million views. The clip was shot during three days in Bucharest, Romania and sees Stan and her backup dancers performing choreographed dances, which were choreographed by Romanian performer Emil Rengle.

The recording was met with positive reviews. Digital Journal praised the song for being "catchy", and Stan for providing "honey-rich" vocals. In an interview, Alexandra Stan explained that "Dance" is a "very sexy club song and club image". The track was performed during Stan's Unlocked Tour (2014). The song became a success in Japan, where it ranked at number 25 on the Japan Hot 100.

Composition
 "Dance" was recorded at Fonogram Studios in Bucharest, Romania. Stan first thought of the song's melody and lyrics in Paris, and later brought her idea for further development by her team at Fonogram Records, led by producers Alexandru Cotoi and Mika Moupondo. The song is a dance track, also incorporating house music influences into its sound. The track opens with acoustic guitar chords, which are then followed by a pop strophe. The refrain consists of a saxophone drop, which is backed by cut saws and plucks. "Dance" ends with the last lyrics of the song being backed by acoustic guitar. Lyrically, the track speaks about the art of dancing, but also features references to friendship and romance. Markos Papadatos from Digital Journal pointed out the opening lyrics of the song for beginning rebellious, but turning into positive and optimistic. He also compared the instrumentation of "Dance" with that one of Kesha's "Die Young".

Critical response
Markos Papadatos from Digital Journal compared "Dance" to Stan's 2010 song "Mr. Saxobeat", confessing that the song "has a catchy melody". He went on praising Stan's "honey-rich" voice on the verses "Why don't you dance dance dance / and fall in love with friends / let's start a new romance". Furthermore, Papadatos said that the track deserves to top the Billboard Hot Dance Club Songs charts. Concerning the music video of "Dance", he praised Khaled Mokhtar for doing a "brilliant job directing [the clip]", and Emil Rengle for choreographing "the dancers and Stan in the video exceptionally well". He went on saying that Stan "looks breathtakingly beautiful in this video". Papadatos gave the music video and the song itself an A rating. Everything Express writer Robin Catling described the track as a "summery David Guetta-inspired Euro-dance number that rattles along". He criticised the song's quality, saying that "even S-Club 7 had better material than this". Direct Lyrics praised "Dance" for having "enough summer flavour to do well this upcoming hot season" and confessed that they like the track better than its predecessor, "Cherry Pop". Los 40 Principales cited the video for "Dance" as one of Stan's best clips ever.

Track listings

Digital download
"Dance" – 3:41

Italian digital download
"Dance" (Radio Edit) – 3:41
"Dance" (Grano Remix) – 4:18

German digital remix EP
"Dance" (Radio Edit) – 3:41
"Dance" (Grano Remix) – 4:18

Spanish digital remix EP
"Dance" (Geo Da Silva & Jack Mazzoni Radio Edit) – 3:16
"Dance" (DJ Kone & Marc Palacios Radio Edit) – 3:43
"Dance" (CryDuom Radio Edit) – 3:16
"Dance" (Geo Da Silva & Jack Mazzoni Remix) – 4:03
"Dance" (DJ Kone & Marc Palacios Remix) – 6:25
"Dance" (CryDuom Extended) – 3:58

Credits and personnel
Credits adapted from the liner notes of Unlocked and The Collection.

Recording and vocal credits
Recorded at Fonogram Studios in Bucharest, Romania.
Produced for Fonogram Music Production in Bucharest, Romania.
Alexandra Stan – lead vocals

Technical and songwriting credits
Cosmin Basasteanu – songwriter
Alexandru Cotoi – songwriter, mixing, producer
Erik Lidbom – songwriter, mixing engineer
Mika Moupondo – songwriter
Lee Anna McCollum – songwriter

Visual credits
Alex Ifimov – make-up artist, hairstyling
Oana Imbrea – producing coordinator
Laurent Marel – colorist
Andra Moga – styling
Khaled Mokhtar – director of photography, regisor
Emil Rengle – choreography

Charts

Release history

References

External links
 

2014 songs
Alexandra Stan songs
English-language Romanian songs
Dance-pop songs
Romanian songs
2014 singles
Songs about dancing
Songs written by Alexandra Stan
Songs written by Mohombi
Songs written by Alexandru Cotoi